Anveshanam is a 2020 Indian Malayalam-language mystery-thriller drama film directed by Prasobh Vijayan.  The film stars Jayasurya, Leona Lishoy, Shruthi Ramachandran, Nandhu, Vijay Babu, Lal Paul and Lena Kumar in the lead roles.

Plot

The story starts in the evening, as the boy is injured and unconscious and taken to hospital by his mother and family friend. At the hospital, the mother and family friend claim that the boy had fallen down the stairs in the apartment and got the head injury. Mystery starts as everyone has their version of the events and they don't seem to match each other.

The police get involved and an investigation is initiated. Meanwhile, the boy breathes his last.

The point of view, takes the audience through, whether the boy had an accident or is it a murder...any foul play involved, or any child abuse possible.

The IPS, a lady police officer, is very suspicious about some possible 'cover-up' activities, to hush up this boy's death. The investigation keeps the audience on their toes, suspense is nail biting, make us guessing who the villain is or villains are.

Cast
Jayasurya as Aravind
Vijay Babu as Dr. Gautham
Shruti Ramachandran as Kavitha Aravind
Leona Lishoy as ACP Latha Siddarth IPS
Nandhu as Alphonse
Lal Paul as Dr. Fariz (Cameo Appearance)
Lena Kumar as Sister Sony
Jai Vishnu as Sarath
Shaju K S as Kumar
 Srikant Murali as Dr. Ashok

Production
Writer Francis Thomas approached E4 Entertainment in early 2018 with his script and they confirmed it as one of their upcoming projects. During the same time, Prasobh Vijayan was making his directoral debut through Lilli which was also released by a sibling banner of E4 Entertainment. Following the warm reception of Lilli, Prasobh was hired as the director for Anveshanam with Jayasurya to play the lead character. Thomas's wife, actress Shruti Ramachandran, was cast as a lead character as well. The movie was initially planned for September 2019 which was later moved to November. However, due to incomplete post-production works, the movie was further postponed and finally confirmed to be released on 31 January 2020.

Release 

The film was released on 31 January 2020.

References

External links
 

Indian thriller drama films
2020s Malayalam-language films
2020 films
2020 thriller drama films
Films scored by Jakes Bejoy